Enrico Garff (26 November 1939) is an Italian portrait Master painter and colourist. Garff has worked as an artist in Positano, Sorrento, Rome, Sicily and in Sweden and Finland.

Garff's works include oils, watercolours, acrylics, gouaches and paintings on silk. His favourite themes are humans, horses and mythology.
His art can be found in the homes of many a lover of art and horses in Finland, in addition to some works displayed in public buildings. The artist's largest work in oils is seven metres wide. In Hufvudstadsbladet Helena Husman gives a thorough description of this painting ‘Sons of the Sun’ which is collocated at the Kamp Social Services Centre in Helsinki. This pictorial ode to mythology and joy is painted on five canvases and was inaugurated in 2003 together with the second portrait of President Martti Ahtisaari. Opening speeches for this event were conducted by Ms Eeva Ahtisaari and by the artist's wife, Ms Isabella Diana Gripenberg.

Biography 
Enrico Garff was born in Rome, Italy in 1939 as a true ‘figlio d’arte’. His father, Emilio Boffi, was an opera singer whose career, however, was impaired by his nervous disposition. His mother, Gertrud Garff, the daughter of a Swedish pharmacist, had arrived in Rome to study lyrical singing. She had already managed to perform with the "King of Baritones", Mattia Battistini but her career too ended in tragedy as she lost her fine operatic voice virtually overnight.

Enrico Garff, an autodidact, started drawing at the age of six. From the very beginning he always regarded himself as a painter. "I have continued to paint and draw throughout my life. A picture should be a living entity and children are instinctively aware of this. The most important feature in depicting a horse is movement and in many classical music scores one can detect the tempo of the trot and the gallop."

At the age of 19, Garff began to exhibit his oeuvres in collaboration with experienced artists in Via Massaciuccoli and Via Margutta where many of his works were immediately sold. Nevertheless, he resisted the temptation to make his art his sole profession. He continued his studies in humanities and in 1969 took his degree at the L'Orientale", Università degli Studi di Napoli "L'Orientale" and wrote his doctoral thesis on the Swedish poet Carl Snoilsky.

In 1970 Garff married the Finnish Baroness Isabella Diana Gripenberg who was the granddaughter of the poet Bertel Gripenberg. Isa Gripenberg, Isabella Diana's mother reported: "Shortly after my daughter Diana's arrival in Rome she and I participated in a party that had been arranged for young people. Suddenly a young man appeared who was so pleasant and handsome that I could not help the feeling in my heart that this man, who would be an ideal husband for Diana, could not possibly be single and unattached. A little later when I mentioned to the Italian speaking party that Diana wished to learn Italian from a specialized language teacher, a man answered, almost at once, in perfect Swedish that he occasionally gave private lessons. That man was the one I had noticed as he had entered the room earlier. He was Enrico Garff.

Sorrento and Naples 

Enrico and Diana went to live in Sorrento where their first son, Henrik Daniel and his sister Pamina Victoria, were born. Their second son, Beniamino Michele, was born in Rome in 1988. For seven years the artist supported his family as a language teacher at the university in Naples. However his energy enabled him to paint and exhibit many works in oils in Naples and Sorrento, in Frascati and even in Rome where his sole exhibition in the Saletta Marguttiana was inaugurated by the Swedish Ambassador to Italy.

Garff's exhibitions in Naples were well received by the newspaper Napoli Notte and by the magazine Eco d’arte moderna. Art critic Nino del Prete wrote that Garff's pallette was the chromatically richest one possibly could imagine. In 1971 renowned art critic Paolo Ricci visited Garff's first sole exhibition in Naples and encouraged him by comparing his brush to that of Antonio Ligabue. In 1972 in an article in the summer supplement of the daily paper Il Messaggero, N. Nobiloni wrote that the oil painting, ‘Quercia Falconieri,’ which brought Enrico Garff the second prize of the ‘Concorso Internazionale di Pittura Italia 2000’, depicts a famous oak at the gate of Villa Falconieri in Frascati. The words that Nobiloni uses when describing Garff's paintings such as "intense", "rich" and "violent" are very much the same description that seventeen years later, Federico Fellini's wife Giulietta Masina would write in the painter's guest book at the debut of the Gruppo Zuleika in Rome.

Grottaferrata 

In 1978, the painter rented a small house in Grottaferrata for his wife and children. In an article in the Finnish-Swedish magazine for culture, Astra, later Astra Nova, Dean Dixon's widow, Mary Mandelin Dixon pictures the rural life of the artist and his family in the little fairy tale house amongst figs, grapes and pink roses and bordering on a meadow from which there was a lovely view on Tusculum. In this romantic place Garff, assisted by his spouse and mother in law, organized a special exhibition for Scandinavian tourists (June 1977) and he even sung Neapolitan songs to the visitors. With the money that this exhibition added to his income, a month later he financed the families move to Sweden. He left his post at the university, allowing himself the freedom to travel and to paint full-time.

Sweden 

This was the beginning of an odyssey that led the artist and his family from Gothenburg in Sweden to Taormina in Sicily, to Piano di Sorrento and Positano, to Rome, and Castelnuovo Di Porto, to the Castelli Romani and finally to Finland.

In Sweden, Diana worked as a teacher and even set up a kindergarten and Enrico had plenty of time for artistic work, but only a few exhibitions were set up and the new and promising contacts seemed to lead nowhere.

Sicily 

In 1981 Enrico Garff was back in Italy, this time in Sicily where contacts seemed more promising. Quite soon he exhibited a series of new paintings in collaboration with Jano Barbagallo and Gianni Pennisi in the Galleria La Spirale in Acireale, and he was introduced to the much beloved Sicilian poet Renzino Barbera  who wrote the introduction for Enrico's exhibition in the Palazzo Corvaja in Taormina in May and June 1981.

Piano di Sorrento and Positano 

In 1982, Garff accepted the opportunity offered to him by the university in Naples, of teaching Scandinavian languages and literature. He now transferred his family to a medieval house in Piano di Sorrento but this choice very nearly put an end to Diana's life - she was allergic to the invisible damp mould in the apartment and could hardly breathe. Pio Lanfranco, a friend of the family who was the youngest son of Emilio Imperiali 9th prince of Francavilla, saved Diana. He brought her to a more suitable residence in Calabria where his cousin had inherited an old hunting lodge.

Soon after the month in Calabria the painter, Ottavio Romano, invited Enrico's family to live in his apartment in Positano.

Zuleika "Coloristi della Nuova Intuizione" 

In 1989, Enrico Garff went to live quite close to the Colosseum here he founded the Gruppo Zuleika, Colourists of New Intuition, together with Romeo Mesisca, a disciple of Renato Guttuso in collaboration with two other artists. After a short exhibition in the private apartment of the Swedish minister of culture in Rome, the Gruppo Zuleika put 100 paintings on display in Villa Aurinko in Capena.
A renowned critic, Enrico Gallian wrote Coloristi Zuleika e l'epilogo di una fiaba, came on foot to Villa Aurinko. In the daily paper l’ Unità, he wrote a very positive article on all of the artists in the Zuleika Group and in particular he praised the transparent poetry of Enrico Garff's landscapes and the interiors of Romeo Mesisca.
The Zuleika exhibition continued later in the Via del Corso in Rome. In spite of the immediate success (more than two thousand visitors in less than 16 hours) the group lasted only a couple of years, and the reason was undoubtedly the lack of money needed for the planned itinerary in Europe.
Some of Diana's optimistic investments put Garff in economic trouble.

The "haunted house" 

The family went to live in a small house outside Frascati, but from the very first day that little house seemed haunted. Through the old roof, rainwater dripped into one of the bedrooms. The painter and his family encountered both accidents and misfortune. All except little Beniamino were rushed to hospital and had to undergo operations. Pamina was stung by one of the dangerous hornets that for some weeks honoured the house with frequent visits. Enrico's work was disturbed by all kinds of noises - there seemed to be a corridor of sound leading from the village piazza to his studio, and in the night the never sleeping nightjars kept laughing happily in the chestnut trees of the garden.

Finland 

Once again the move from South to North was financed through the selling of paintings, but this time Enrico obtained financial support from an Italian friend and the so-called king of Åland, the finance man Anders Wiklöf.

In 2005 when the Artist ran an exhibition at the Maunula St. Peter Christian Assembly Church in Helsinki, the Local Maunula Sanomat Newspaper Magazine issued an article concerning Maestro Garff's art.

In Helsinki, the painter's brush set to work again. Garff's painting -"The return of Marcus Aurelius" had been transported to Finland long before its creator. By a group of art lovers, among whom were the philosopher Henrik von Wright, the poet Lassi Nummi, and the teacher Ms. Riitta Harjunen."The Return of Marcus Aurelius" was donated to the presidential residence at Mäntyniemi in Helsinki where it was collocated the day before president Ahtisaari and his wife moved into the house.

Some of Enrico Garff's best horse pictures have been painted in Helsinki:
"Isabella with the dove of peace on Bramante" is permanently on display in the city's main library, and "Joie du Vivre", belongs to Judge Anja Tulenheimo-Takki.
Thanks to the many friends and contacts of Garff's mother-in-law, Isa Gripenberg, a door opened to the painter in the northern country, totally different from Italy. Isa even handed over a letter from Diana to Luciano Pavarotti when the singer visited Helsinki. The letter contained many photos of Enrico Garff's art and a request for an interview on the mission of art that the singer consented her in Bologna in February 1989. At the question "which art gives the artist the most liberty?" the great Italian answered with one word only: Painting!

Paintings, photographs and comments   

"The first thing that strikes one in Garff's painting is that his images appeal directly to the senses; looking at his landscapes, a perception of moisture in the air can almost be felt on the skin. Garff prefers an intensive perspective based on colour to a traditional geometrical structure. Light and space are created by chromatic contrasts. One can sense a tension vibrating between nature and the human figure which I dare to call "mythical". The strong contrast between pale luminosity and heavy dark surfaces seems to spring from an unseen dimension of myth and human destiny. The contrasts created among the elements, air, water and earth excite the imagination and stimulate the interest of the observer. In the foreground, Joy and Harmony predominate, but in the background gather the shadows of a tragic destiny."

"In some paintings the figures seem to belong simultaneously to two different worlds, to this familiar physical one, and to an upper ethereal air. In an inexplicable way, the spiritual dimension of this painter's Art is constantly born from the very touch of his brush. Some of his works evoke an atmosphere which recalls Blake, others bring to mind Dante."
"It is amazing to become aware of the way the surrounding environment, once it has entered his heart and he has made it his own, changes into a creative force moving towards the original sources of creation. My belief is that the art of this painter is born from the contradiction and meeting of instinct and culture".

Enrico Garff loves pictorial intuition, not to be confounded with instinctive painting. The pictorial intuition opens the mind towards an intelligence which is freer and faster and even more penetrating than ordinary analytical thinking.

Enrico Garff involved in November 2018 by SoCultures in a profound and spiritually enriching interview -"The world of Enrico Garff"- regarding the meaning of art, life, with deep philosophical insights.

References

External links 
 
Facebook Official Page
Fine Art America
Official YouTube Channel

Official Artmarket Artprice Profile
 

20th-century Italian painters
Italian male painters
21st-century Italian painters
Living people
1939 births
People from Sorrento
20th-century Italian male artists
21st-century Italian male artists
Contemporary artists
Contemporary painters